Tacuna is a genus of South American jumping spiders that was first described by George and Elizabeth Peckham in 1901.

Species
 it contains four species, found only in Argentina and Brazil:
Tacuna delecta Peckham & Peckham, 1901 (type) – Brazil, Argentina
Tacuna minensis Galiano, 1995 – Brazil
Tacuna saltensis Galiano, 1995 – Argentina
Tacuna vaga (Peckham & Peckham, 1895) – Brazil

References

Salticidae genera
Salticidae
Spiders of South America